Celerio may refer to:

Levi Celerio, a Filipino composer and lyricist
Celerio Reef, the Filipino name for Swallow Reef in the Spratly Islands of the South China Sea
Suzuki Celerio, a city car

Lepidoptera
A synonym of the moth genus Hyles (moth), examples:
Celerio euphorbiae
Celerio galii
Heterochroa celerio, the celerio sister, a butterfly
Hippotion celerio, the vine hawk-moth or silver-striped hawk-moth